Platyedra erebodoxa is a moth of the family Gelechiidae. It was described by Edward Meyrick in 1927. It is found in the Democratic Republic of the Congo (Kasai-Occidental, Maniema) and Cameroon.

The wingspan is 17–19 mm. The forewings are light brownish ochreous irregularly mixed with dark fuscous and with a dark bluish-fuscous spot on the base of the costa. The dorsum is narrowly suffused with dark fuscous and there is a suffused dark fuscous transverse fascia before the middle. The posterior two-fifths is wholly dark fuscous except a pale brownish-ochreous spot on the costa at four-fifths and a dot on the tornus opposite. The hindwings are grey.

The larvae feed on Hibiscus diversifolius and Dombeya emarginata.

References

Moths described in 1927
Pexicopiini